Finland competed at the 2018 Winter Olympics in Pyeongchang, South Korea, from 9 to 25 February 2018, with 100 competitors in 11 sports. They won six medals in total, one gold, one silver and four bronze, ranking 18th in the medal table.

Medalists

Competitors
The following is the list of number of competitors participating at the Games per sport/discipline.

Alpine skiing 

Finland has qualified two athletes.

Biathlon 

Based on their Nations Cup rankings in the 2016–17 Biathlon World Cup, Finland has qualified a team of 5 men and 5 women. Finland decided to send a team of 3 men and 5 women.

Men

Women

Mixed

Cross-country skiing 

Distance
Men

Women

Sprint
Men

Women

Curling 
Summary

Mixed doubles tournament

Based on results from 2016 World Mixed Doubles Curling Championship and 2017 World Mixed Doubles Curling Championship, Finland has qualified their mixed doubles as the highest ranked nations.

Draw 1
Thursday, February 8, 9:05

Draw 2
Thursday, February 8, 20:04

Draw 3
Friday, February 9, 8:35

Draw 4
Friday, February 9, 13:35

Draw 5
Saturday, February 10, 9:05

Draw 6
Saturday, February 10, 20:04

Draw 7
Sunday, February 11, 9:05

Figure skating 

Finland qualified one female figure skater through the 2017 CS Nebelhorn Trophy.

Freestyle skiing 

Moguls

Slopestyle

Ice hockey 

Summary

Men's tournament

Finland men's national ice hockey team qualified by finishing 4th in the 2015 IIHF World Ranking.

Team roster
Men's team event – 1 team of 25 players

Preliminary round

Qualification playoff

Quarterfinal

Women's tournament

Finland women's national ice hockey team qualified by finishing 3rd in the 2016 IIHF World Ranking.

Team roster
Women's team event – 1 team of 23 players

Preliminary round

Quarterfinal

Semifinal

Bronze medal game

Nordic combined

Ski jumping 

Men

Women

Snowboarding 

Finland has nominated 8 athletes: Enni Rukajärvi, Roope Tonteri, Kalle Järvilehto, Rene Rinnekangas, Peetu Piiroinen, Markus Malin, Janne Korpi and Anton Lindfors.

Freestyle
Men

Women

Snowboard cross

Qualification legend: FA – Qualify to medal final; FB – Qualify to consolation final

Speed skating

See also 
Finland at the 2018 Winter Paralympics

References

Nations at the 2018 Winter Olympics
2018
Winter Olympics